Otis is a Statutory Town in Washington County, Colorado, United States. The population was 475 at the 2010 census.

History
Otis was established in 1882 as a construction campsite for workers building the Burlington & Missouri River rail line from Lincoln Nebr to Denver, Colo. According to tradition, the community was named after W. O. Otis, a pioneer settler. The post office opened in 1886 and the town was platted in 1887.

Geography
Otis is located at  (40.150645, -102.962521).

Demographics

As of the census of 2000, there were 534 people, 218 households, and 146 families residing in the town. The racial makeup of the town was 97.57% White, 0.19% Native American, 1.69% from other races, and 0.56% from two or more races. Hispanic or Latino of any race were 3.00% of the population.

There were 218 households, out of which 33.5% had children under the age of 18 living with them, 53.7% were married couples living together, 9.2% had a female householder with no husband present, and 33.0% were non-families. 30.3% of all households were made up of individuals, and 15.6% had someone living alone who was 65 years of age or older. The average household size was 2.45 and the average family size was 3.03.

In the town, the population was spread out, with 29.8% under the age of 18, 6.7% from 18 to 24, 24.9% from 25 to 44, 20.4% from 45 to 64, and 18.2% who were 65 years of age or older. The median age was 36 years. For every 100 females, there were 100.8 males. For every 100 females age 18 and over, there were 90.4 males.

The median income for a household in the town was $31,333, and the median income for a family was $35,000. Males had a median income of $30,089 versus $20,833 for females. The per capita income for the town was $19,719. About 3.9% of families and 7.3% of the population were below the poverty line, including 3.0% of those under age 18 and 16.4% of those age 65 or over.

Climate
According to the Köppen Climate Classification system, Otis has a semi-arid climate, abbreviated "BSk" on climate maps.

See also

Outline of Colorado
Index of Colorado-related articles
Colorado municipalities
Colorado counties

References

External links
Town of Otis
CDOT map of the Town of Otis

Towns in Washington County, Colorado
Towns in Colorado